David Gordon Perry (26 December 1937 – ) was an  international rugby union player and captain.

Career 
Perry was capped 15 times for England between 1963 and 1966, making thirteen appearances at number eight and two at lock. He scored two international tries, and captained England in all four internationals in the 1965 Five Nations Championship.

He played for Cambridge in the 1958 Varsity match and played club rugby for Bedford.  He played four matches for Leicester Tigers at the end of the 1959-60 season.

Perry and his wife Dorne have four grown-up daughters.

He died in April 2017 at the age of 79.

References

External links
 A biography of David Perry can be found at http://www.debretts.com/people/biographies/browse/p/8716/David+Gordon.aspx

1937 births
2017 deaths
People educated at Clifton College
English rugby union players
England international rugby union players
Cambridge University R.U.F.C. players
Rugby union number eights
Rugby union locks
Bedford Blues players
Leicester Tigers players

Alumni of Christ's College, Cambridge